Saint-Germain-des-Fossés station (French: Gare de Saint-Germain-des-Fossés) is a railway station in Saint-Germain-des-Fossés, Auvergne-Rhône-Alpes, France. The station opened on 18 June 1854 and is located on the Moret–Lyon, Saint-Germain-des-Fossés–Nîmes and Saint-Germain-des-Fossés–Clermont-Ferrand via Vichy railway lines. The station is served by Intercités (long distance) and TER (local) services operated by SNCF.

Train services
The following services call at Saint-Germain-des-Fossés as of 2022:
intercity services (Intercités): (Nantes -) Tours - Bourges - Nevers - Moulins - Saint-Germain-des-Fossés - Roanne - Lyon
local service (TER Auvergne-Rhône-Alpes): (Nevers -) Moulins - Saint-Germain-des-Fossés - Vichy - Clermont-Ferrand

Bus services
Buses depart from Saint-Germain-des-Fossés to Montluçon and Vichy.

References

Railway stations in Allier
Railway stations in France opened in 1854